Joseph Kerski is a geographer with a focus on the use of Geographic Information Systems (GIS) in education.

Joseph Kerski was the President of the National Council for Geographic Education in 2011. He is the author of the recent book Interpreting Our World and is the co-author of the book The Essentials of the Environment.

He has served as a geographer in 4 major sectors of society, including government (with NOAA, the US Census Bureau, and the US Geological Survey), academia (with Sinte Gleska University, the University of Denver, and as MOOC instructor for Penn State University, Elmhurst College, and eNet Learning), private industry (as Education Manager for Esri), and nonprofit organizations (with roles in the National Council for Geographic Education, the American Association of Geographers, and others).  
He has created over 5,000 videos on the Our Earth channel, writes about geospatial data for Spatial Reserves, and creates a career podcast for Directions Magazine.  

Joseph Kerski has authored over 75 chapters and articles on Geographic Information Systems (GIS), education, physical and cultural geography, mathematics, fieldwork, teaching and learning, and related topics, and makes frequent presentations at conferences and university campuses.  He is active in conducting professional development training for primary and secondary educators.  He sits on the editorial Board of the Institute of Mathematical Geography (Solstice).  He has authored or co-authored 7 books, including Interpreting Our World: 100 Discoveries that Revolutionized Geography, Essentials of the Environment, Spatial Mathematics, Tribal GIS, International Perspectives on Teaching and Learning in Secondary Education, and the GIS Guide to Public Domain Data.  In 2018, he gave a presentation on the Whys of Where at TEDx Vail, focusing on the importance of mapping and geotechnologies in education and society.

References 

Living people
American geographers
National Oceanic and Atmospheric Administration personnel
United States Census Bureau people
United States Geological Survey personnel
Sinte Gleska University faculty
University of Denver faculty
Year of birth missing (living people)